The 1986 Little League World Series took place between August 19 and August 23 in Williamsport, Pennsylvania. The Tainan Park Little League of Tainan Park, Taiwan, defeated the International Little League of Tucson, Arizona, in the championship game of the 40th Little League World Series.

Teams

Championship bracket

Position bracket

References

External links

Little League World Series
Little League World Series
Little League World Series